Yuu Aung Chit Mae Lu is a 2019 Burmese romantic-drama film starring Nay Toe, Eaindra Kyaw Zin, May Toe Khine, Min Tharke. The film, produced by Shwe Sin Oo Film Production premiered in Myanmar on September 12, 2019.

Cast
Nay Toe as A Linn Thit
Eaindra Kyaw Zin as La Yake Nyo
May Toe Khine as Akhayar
Min Tharke

References

2019 films
2010s Burmese-language films
Burmese romantic drama films
Films shot in Myanmar
2019 romantic drama films